Robert Cardillo is a Distinguished Fellow at Georgetown University’s Center for Security and Emerging Technology. Prior to this appointment, he was the sixth Director of the National Geospatial-Intelligence Agency and was sworn in October 3, 2014. He was previously selected by Director of National Intelligence James Clapper to serve as the first Deputy Director of National Intelligence for Intelligence Integration in September 2010. Clapper said in a statement that the position would "elevate information sharing and collaboration" between those who collect intelligence and those who analyze it. Cardillo previously served as deputy director of the Defense Intelligence Agency (DIA). Prior to that, he served as the deputy director for Analysis, DIA, and Director, Analysis and Production, National Geospatial-Intelligence Agency (NGA).

Early life and education
Cardillo earned a Bachelor of Arts in Government from Cornell University in 1983 and a Master of Arts in National Security Studies from Georgetown University in 1988. He is an alumnus of the Council for Excellence in Government, the Joint Chiefs of Staff Capstone Course, and Harvard University's Program for Senior Managers in Government. Cardillo is the recipient of the Presidential Rank of Distinguished Executive, Presidential Rank of Meritorious Executive, Vice President's Hammer Award, the Chairman of the Joint Chiefs of Staff Joint Meritorious Civilian Service Award, DIA's Analyst of the Year, Director DIA's Intelligence Award, and the NGA's Distinguished Civilian Service Award.

Intelligence career
Cardillo began his career with the DIA in 1983 as an imagery analyst. In May 2000 he was selected to join the Defense Intelligence Senior Executive Service. Throughout his career, he has served in a variety of leadership positions within the Intelligence Community. He led NGA's Analysis and Production Directorate and Source Operations and Management Directorate from 2002 to 2006 and also led NGA's Congressional Affairs, Public Affairs, and Corporate Relations sections. From 2006 to 2010, Cardillo served as deputy director of the Defense Intelligence Agency as a whole and deputy director for analysis, leading DIA's Directorate for Analysis. In summer 2009, he served as the Acting J2, a first for a civilian, in support of the Chairman of the Joint Chiefs of Staff. From 2010 to 2014, Cardillo served as the inaugural Deputy Director of National Intelligence for Intelligence Integration

Director of the National Geospatial-Intelligence Agency
Cardillo became the sixth NGA director in October 2014 and served until his retirement in February 2019.

Controversy
Cardillo's leadership at the National Geospatial-Intelligence Agency was marked by numerous issues that involved his leadership team and also his decision to have a family friend, Bobby Knight, deliver an address to the workforce on leadership. In 2015, Bobby Knight visited the agency and during that visit was accused by 4 female employees of inappropriate behavior. The result was an FBI investigation into the matter. While the FBI did not bring charges, the incident was a concern that affected agency employee engagement and morale.

In February 2019, the Department of Defense (DoD) Inspector General published a report that found Ms. Ellen Ardrey, the agency Director of Human Capital, circumvented department policy and wasted government resources. Ms. Ardrey's circumvention of policy resulted in a cost to the government of $280,000. Specifically, the investigation determined that Ms. Ardrey improperly permitted NGA senior officials to downgrade themselves to non-senior official positions within the agency for one pay period, and then paid them $40,000 each as buyout incentives to leave the agency. In part  Ms. Ardrey's acts were motivated by her desire to implement Director Cardillo's organizational vision.

Also in February 2019, the DoD Inspector General concluded an investigation of Mr. Cardillo's Deputy, Justin Poole. The investigation concluded that Poole engaged in an inappropriate and unprofessional relationship with a subordinate from July 2018 through November 2018. He was placed on Administrative leave on 27 February 2019.

After NGA
In May 2019, Cardillo was named a Distinguished Geospatial Fellow at Saint Louis University in which he will advise on strategy for geospatial growth in St. Louis. His role includes advising the growth of GeoSLU, Saint Louis University's geospatial research, training, and innovation initiative, and advising the Cortex Innovation Community on geospatial strategy, innovation, and commercialization.

In March 2021, Cardillo was elected as chairman of the Board of the United States Geospatial Intelligence Foundation USGIF.

In April 2021, Cardillo joined Planet Federal as chairman of the board and Chief Strategist. Planet Federal is a division of Earth imaging company Planet Labs dealing with federal contracts; it has ties to the Intelligence Community and is a satellite imagery vendor to the community through NGA and NRO.

Personal life
A runner who has completed five Marine Corps Marathons, Cardillo resides in Alexandria, Virginia. As of 2014, he had a wife, three children, and two grandchildren.

References

External links

Cornell University alumni
Deputy Directors of the Defense Intelligence Agency
Directors of the National Geospatial-Intelligence Agency
Walsh School of Foreign Service alumni
Living people
Obama administration personnel
Trump administration personnel
People from Alexandria, Virginia
Year of birth missing (living people)